is an underground metro station located in Mizuho-ku, Nagoya, Aichi Prefecture, Japan operated by the Nagoya Municipal Subway's Meijō Line. It is located 19.4 kilometers from the terminus of the Meijō Line at Kanayama Station.

History
Mizuho Undōjō Higashi Station was opened on 6 October 2004.

Lines

 (Station number: M22)

Layout
Mizuho Undōjō Higashi Station has one underground island platform.

Platforms

References

External links
 Mizuho Undōjō Higashi Station official web site 

Railway stations in Japan opened in 2004
Railway stations in Aichi Prefecture